Begnon-Damien Koné (1921 – 10 February 1986) was a Burkinabé politician who served in the French Senate from 1958 to 1959.

Koné was born in 1921 in Tengrela, Burkina Faso, into a notable family. He studied at Bingerville upper primary school, where he obtained the CEPS (Certificate of Higher Primary Studies).

He was elected to the French Senate on 9 June 1958 as senator for Haute-Volta, and was  President of the National Assembly of Upper Volta. His term in the senate ended on 15 July 1959.

He died on 10 February 1986 in Colombes, France.

References 

Burkinabé politicians
Presidents of the National Assembly of Burkina Faso
French Senators of the Fourth Republic
1921 births
1986 deaths
People from Cascades Region
Senators of French West Africa